Rostov-on-Don North is an airbase of the Russian Air Force located in Rostov-on-Don, Rostov Oblast, Russia.

The base is home to the 30th Independent Composite Transport Aviation Regiment flying Antonov An-12BK, Antonov An-26, Antonov An-148, Ilyushin Il-20M, Mil Mi-24P/V, Mil Mi-26/26T/T3 under the 4th Air and Air Defence Forces Army.

References

Russian Air Force bases
Airports in Rostov Oblast